Camp Lincoln was an American Civil War camp that existed in 1861 in Worcester, Massachusetts. It was located on the Agricultural Fairgrounds, around the Elm Park neighborhood. It was named after Levi Lincoln Jr., the 13th Governor of Massachusetts and first Mayor of Worcester. On June 3, 1862, the camp was renamed Camp Wool, in honor of John E. Wool, the oldest general in the regular army. Units trained here included the 21st, 25th, 34th, 36th, 49th, 51st, and 57th regiments of Massachusetts infantry. Camp Scott, named for Major General Winfield Scott, also existed in Worcester for about 6 weeks in June–August 1861 as a training camp for the 15th Massachusetts Infantry Regiment.

Units Trained
21st Regiment Massachusetts Volunteer Infantry
25th Regiment Massachusetts Volunteer Infantry
34th Regiment Massachusetts Volunteer Infantry
36th Regiment Massachusetts Volunteer Infantry
49th Regiment Massachusetts Volunteer Infantry
51st Regiment Massachusetts Volunteer Infantry
57th Regiment Massachusetts Volunteer Infantry

Today
The site today is a dense neighborhood, partly occupied by Becker College, established in 1887. A plaque commemorating the Camp stands at Elm Park, which sits just across from where the fairgrounds were located.

See also
 List of military installations in Massachusetts

References

1861 establishments in Massachusetts
Military installations established in 1861
Military facilities in Massachusetts
History of Worcester, Massachusetts
Buildings and structures in Worcester, Massachusetts